Travis Scott is a former guard in the National Football League. He was drafted in the fourth round of the 2002 NFL Draft by the St. Louis Rams and played that pre-season with the team and was released. He also spent the following pre-season with the New York Giants.

References

External links
 Arizona State Sun Devils bio

1979 births
Living people
Arizona State Sun Devils football players
American football offensive guards
New York Giants players
People from Artesia, California
Players of American football from California
Sportspeople from Los Angeles County, California
St. Louis Rams players